Trenchia agulhasae argentinae is a subspecies of sea snail, a marine gastropod mollusk, unassigned in the superfamily Seguenzioidea.

Description
The shell grows to a height of 3.5 mm.

Distribution
This subspecies occurs in the Atlantic Ocean in the abyssal zone off Argentina.

References

 McLean J.H. (1992). Systematic review of the family Choristellidae (Archeogastropoda: Lepetellacea) with descriptions of new species. The Veliger 35(4): 273-294 page(s): 293

External links
 To Encyclopedia of Life
 To World Register of Marine Species

agulhasae argentinae
Gastropods described in 1961